Kolartan (also Romanized as Kolārtān, Kalārtān, and Kolortān) is a village in Baraan-e Jonubi Rural District, in the Central District of Isfahan County, Isfahan Province, Iran. At the 2006 census, its population was 506, in 133 families.

References 

Populated places in Isfahan County